Longkou Township is a rural township in Xiangtan County, Xiangtan City, Hunan Province, People's Republic of China.  it had a population of 29,215 and an area of .

Administrative division
The township is divided into 20 villages, the following areas: Jianlou Village, Xingyun Village, Dongjiaping Village, Longkou Village, Dajiang Village, Changshoucun Village, Niwan Village, Tanxi Village, Jiuru Village, Nongzi Village, Jinzi Village, Hongling Village, Shaojiang Village, Pipa Village, Tianlong Village, Jinbao Village, Rihua Village, Tuanjian Village, Ziqiao Village, and Shipai Village.

History
In 1950, Longkou Township was built.

Economy
The Region abounds with gypsum.

Rice, fish, pig, bamboo and peanut are important to the economy.

Culture
Huaguxi is the most influence local theater.

References

Historic township-level divisions of Xiangtan
Divisions of Xiangtan County